Spider-Man: Shattered Dimensions is a 2010 action-adventure video game based on the Marvel Comics superhero Spider-Man. Players control four different versions of Spider-Man, each originating from a different universe in the Marvel Comics multiverse. Previous Spider-Man voice actors Neil Patrick Harris, Christopher Daniel Barnes, Dan Gilvezan, and Josh Keaton each voice one of the four Spider-Men.

The game revolves around an artifact known as the Tablet of Order and Chaos. When it is shattered into pieces during a fight between Spider-Man and Mysterio, it causes problems with multiple realities across the Marvel Multiverse. Madame Web calls on four versions of Spider-Man from four different realities to restore balance to the multiverse: the Amazing Spider-Man, Spider-Man Noir, Spider-Man 2099, and Ultimate Spider-Man. The player controls each of the four Spider-Men as they attempt to retrieve the tablet fragments from villains within their respective dimensions, who now possess new abilities granted by the tablet.

Shattered Dimensions received mostly positive reviews from critics upon release. Reviewers generally praised the concept of bringing four Marvel universes together, and lauded the voice acting, combat, presentation, humor, and score, though criticism was aimed at the story, choice of villains and the overall design of the cutscenes as well as the technical difficulties.

A sequel, Spider-Man: Edge of Time, was released in October 2011, featuring only the Amazing Spider-Man and Spider-Man 2099. Both the game and its sequel were de-listed from the PlayStation Network and Xbox Live marketplaces in 2014 following the expiration of Activision's existing licensing deal with Marvel. Shattered Dimensions was re-released via Steam on October 24, 2015, but was later removed on April 1, 2017.

One of the writers of the game, Mark Hoffmeier, also worked on the well-received Spider-Man: The Animated Series on Fox Kids before working on the game.  Some of the concepts from the TV show influenced the game, including the use of multiple versions of Spider-Man (as seen on the show) and the concept of the Tablet of Order and Chaos.  Another version of this, the Tablet of Time, appears in the animated series.  The game is notable for inspiring the 2014 comic book storyline, "Spider-Verse", also written by Dan Slott, which in turn would inspire the 2018 animated film Spider-Man: Into the Spider-Verse.

This game also marks the first time where Spider-Ham appears outside of the comics.

Gameplay
Spider-Man: Shattered Dimensions is a level-based third-person action-adventure video game, where the player assumes the role of one out of four versions of Spider-Man, spanning across the Amazing, Noir, 2099, and Ultimate universes. Gameplay revolves around each Spider-Man's unique superhuman abilities; players are able to web swing, web zip, crawl walls, and use the 'spider-sense' to identify enemies or objects of interest. The combat of the game offers a large variety of fighting moves, and each Spider-Man has his own fighting style. The points necessary for buying upgrades and new fighting moves are earned from defeating enemies or completing various challenges in the "Web of Destiny". The points earned can also be used to purchase 16 alternate costumes (four for each Spider-Man), which do not provide any gameplay advantages and are purely cosmetic.

The game features numerous supervillains from classic Spider-Man comics as bosses; some of the villains are created exclusively for the game, such as the 2099 versions of Hobgoblin and Doctor Octopus, and the Noir version of Hammerhead. All bosses are usually fought twice in a level, and during the second battle, they possess a new series of powers, granted to them by the Tablet of Order and Chaos, requiring players to change their strategy. During specific parts of the boss battles, Shattered Dimensions switches to a first-person perspective, where the player can use the analog sticks (or the Wii Remote and Nunchuk in the Wii version) to control Spider-Man's arms, punching their opponent and dodging their attacks. Three different types of punches are available.

There are several drastic gameplay differences from a Spider-Man to another. For example, the Spider-Man Noir levels require players to hide in the shadows and take down enemies stealthily, whereas the Ultimate Spider-Man levels put more emphasis on combat and often have the player fighting large crowds of enemies; this is possible due this version of Spider-Man being provided with the symbiote black suit by Madame Web that increases his strength. The Spider-Man 2099 levels feature unique free falling segments and a bullet time mechanic, which allows players to slow down time to dodge incoming projectiles.

Nintendo DS version
The Nintendo DS version of Shattered Dimensions is a side-scrolling brawler with little gameplay difference between the multiple iterations of Spider-Man. This version also omits Ultimate Spider-Man, and features less villains: Electro and the Tinkerer for the Amazing Spider-Man; Boomerang and Calypso for Spider-Man Noir; and Vulture and Silvermane for Spider-Man 2099. Not all the moves are available at the beginning, and can be unlocked as players progress through the game.  While most of the action is played with pad and button controls, the touchscreen is used to play a mini-game in between levels to help Spider-Man use the Tablet to travel between dimensions.

Plot
During a confrontation with Mysterio, who attempts to steal the Tablet of Order and Chaos, the Amazing Spider-Man accidentally shatters the Tablet into 17 fragments. While Mysterio makes off with one piece, Spider-Man is approached by Madame Web, who reveals that the other fragments have been scattered across this and three other realities across the Multiverse. To restore balance, Madame Web recruits him, Spider-Man Noir of Earth-20914, Spider-Man 2099 of Earth-928, and Ultimate Spider-Man of Earth-1610 (whose Venom Symbiote is kept in line by Madame Web's powers) to retrieve the fragments from their native dimensions. After the Spider-Men collect their first fragment with no difficulty, Madame Web warns them that the Tablet pieces can grant incredible powers and must not be allowed to fall into the wrong hands.

While searching for their second fragment, the Spider-Men discover that they have already been found by supervillains. In the Amazing universe, Kraven the Hunter forces Spider-Man to overcome a series of trials for a fragment; however, after Spider-Man defeats him, Kraven reneges on their deal and uses the Tablet piece to gain superhuman speed and strength. In the Noir universe, Hammerhead uses a fragment to fuse his guns with his arms and, driven mad by power, seeks to overthrow his boss, Norman "The Goblin" Osborn. In the 2099 universe, Hobgoblin, an android mercenary, uses a fragment to increase his psy-powers and create illusions to torment Spider-Man 2099. In the Ultimate universe, Electro attacks a hydro-electric dam and uses the fragment he found to grow larger and more powerful as he absorbs more energy. In the end, the Spider-Men defeat the villains and retrieve their fragments before heading off to find more.

The Amazing Spider-Man finds another fragment at an abandoned Roxxon Industries quarry, but it is stolen by Sandman, who uses it to increase his powers and take over the quarry. Spider-Man Noir pursues the Vulture, Osborn's right-hand man and his Uncle Ben's killer, for a fragment, which has granted the villain teleportation powers. Spider-Man 2099 faces his half-brother Scorpion of 2099 who has stolen a fragment from the Public Eye Patrol for a contractor in exchange for reversing his mutation, gaining the ability to create numerous offsprings in the process. Ultimate Spider-Man competes in Deadpool's reality TV show, Pain Factor, for a fragment, which the latter eventually uses to clone himself. Meanwhile, Mysterio discovers his fragment granted him magic powers, and seeks out the rest. When the Spider-Men return to Madame Web with the fragments they collected, Mysterio attacks them, threatening to kill Madame Web if they do not deliver the remaining pieces.

The Amazing Spider-Man finds his final fragment at a construction yard, but is forced to intervene in Silver Sable and the Wild Pack's chase of the Juggernaut after the latter unknowingly picks it up. Spider-Man Noir faces Osborn, who used a fragment to gain a goblin-like appearance and took over a carnival to lure him into a trap. Spider-Man 2099 breaks into Alchemax, where he finds his final fragment in the hands of his time period's Doctor Octopus named Dr. Serena Patel, who hopes to use it to power a dangerous reactor. Ultimate Spider-Man visits the Triskelion to seek S.H.I.E.L.D.'s help in finding his final fragment, only to find the base under Carnage's control after S.H.I.E.L.D. scientists fused the creature with a Tablet piece, giving it the ability to resurrect its victims into zombie-like minions.

After retrieving the final set of fragments, the Spider-Men return to Mysterio, who absorbs the complete Tablet after a brief struggle and becomes a god. He shatters the borders between realities, seeking to create a new one under his rule. However, this allows Madame Web to summon the four Spider-Men to fight Mysterio together. After defeating Mysterio and separating him from the Tablet, the Multiverse is restored to normal and Spider-Man Noir, Spider-Man 2099, and Ultimate Spider-Man return to their native realities, while the Amazing Spider-Man takes Mysterio to prison.

In a post-credits scene, Madame Web is visited by Spider-Ham who asks "So, what'd I miss?"

Cast
Each of the different Spider-Men is portrayed by an actor who voiced Spider-Man in a prior animated series:

 Neil Patrick Harris as Peter Parker / The Amazing Spider-Man
The primary, present day traditional version of Spider-Man. After a battle with Mysterio in his home universe, the "Tablet of Order and Chaos" was fragmented and sent to several different alternate dimensions. This version of Spider-Man has to contend with the likes of Kraven the Hunter, the Sandman, and Juggernaut before the final confrontation. Harris previously played Spider-Man in 2003's short-lived Spider-Man: The New Animated Series that spun out of the 2002 film.
 Christopher Daniel Barnes as Peter Parker / Spider-Man Noir
An alternate version of Peter Parker from a dimension referred to as the "Noir Universe". Taking place in 1933, this version of Spider-Man has a darker personality and a more brutal fighting style, with a greater emphasis on stealth. At this time, Spider-Man Noir did not use web-lines in his comic book stories, but Madame Web increases his web control so he can use web-lines in this game. Over the course of his involvement in the story, he is forced to face off against Noir versions of Hammerhead, Vulture, and Norman "The Goblin" Osborn before joining the other Spider-Men to battle Mysterio. Barnes previously acted as Spider-Man in 1994's animated Spider-Man TV series. He would go on to play Spider-Man 2099 in the Shattered Dimensions sequel Spider-Man: Edge of Time.
 Dan Gilvezan as Miguel O'Hara / Spider-Man 2099
A different character who took up the Spider-Man mantle in the future, Miguel O'Hara is forced to contend with the machinations of the evil Alchemax corporation in addition to facing off against future versions of Spider-Man enemies: Hobgoblin, Scorpion, and Doctor Octopus. Though he does not normally have a spider-sense like Peter Parker, Madame Web temporarily gives him a form of it so he can track down the tablet fragments. Gilvezan previously voiced Peter Parker in the 1981 animated series Spider-Man and His Amazing Friends.
 Josh Keaton as Peter Parker / Ultimate Spider-Man
A younger, only slightly altered variation of Peter Parker from a dimension known as the "Ultimate Universe", this version of Spider-Man is fitted with his universe's version of the black symbiote suit that enhances his aggression and pre-existing super strength. Madame Web uses her psychic abilities to keep the suit from overwhelming and corrupting young Peter. In his universe, Ultimate Spider-Man is forced to face off against Electro, Deadpool, and Carnage before joining the final battle. Keaton previously portrayed Spider-Man in the 2008 animated series The Spectacular Spider-Man, as well as other video games like Marvel Super Hero Squad and Marvel vs. Capcom 3: Fate of Two Worlds/Ultimate Marvel vs. Capcom 3. He also went on to play the character's traditional version in the Shattered Dimensions sequel Edge of Time. Prior to playing Spider-Man himself, Keaton also voiced Peter's best friend Harry Osborn in various video games (Spider-Man, Spider-Man 2, and Spider-Man: Friend or Foe), and would later play Electro in Insomniac's Spider-Man.

Several actors return to reprise roles from elsewhere in Spider-Man and Marvel Comics media:

 John DiMaggio (who has also voiced The Rhino multiple times) reprises his role as Hammerhead from The Spectacular Spider-Man.
 Steve Blum (several characters in The Spectacular Spider-Man as well as Wolverine in various media outlets) voices Hobgoblin 2099, Silvermane 2099, Noir Vulture, and Vulture 2099.
 Jim Cummings (Shocker in Spider-Man: The Animated Series) voices Kraven the Hunter, Noir Goblin, Noir Boomerang, and Tinkerer.
 Thomas F. Wilson (Sergeant Stan Carter on The Spectacular Spider-Man) voices Electro and Ultimate Electro.
 Nolan North reprises his role as Deadpool from Hulk Vs.
 Fred Tatasciore reprises his role as Carnage from Spider-Man: Friend or Foe and Marvel: Ultimate Alliance 2.
 Jennifer Hale reprises her role as Silver Sable from the Ultimate Spider-Man video game and Spider-Man: Friend or Foe while also voicing Noir Calypso.
 John Kassir (Deadpool in X-Men Legends II: Rise of Apocalypse, Marvel: Ultimate Alliance and Marvel: Ultimate Alliance 2) voices Scorpion 2099 and a couple of Deadpool's fanboys.
 Tara Strong (Christina in Spider-Man: The New Animated Series) voices Doctor Octopus 2099.
 Gregg Berger (Kraven the Hunter and Mysterio in Spider-Man: The Animated Series, Kingpin in Spider-Man: Web of Shadows) Rodger Bumpass (Doctor Octopus in The Amazing Adventures of Spider-Man), Chris Edgerly (Spider-Man in The Amazing Adventures of Spider-Man), Nick Jameson (Morbius, the Living Vampire and Richard Fisk in Spider-Man: The Animated Series), Keith Szarabajka (Wolverine in Ultimate Spider-Man, Venom in Spider-Man: Web of Shadows, and a Kingpin henchman in Spider-Man: The New Animated Series), James Arnold Taylor (Spider-Man in Spider-Man: Friend or Foe and Spider-Man: Battle for New York, Mysterio in Spider-Man 2, Electro in Ultimate Spider-Man, and Harry Osborn and Frederick Foswell in The Spectacular Spider-Man), and Dave Wittenberg (additional voices in Ultimate Spider-Man) voice different characters throughout the game.

Other cast members include:

 David Kaye as Mysterio
 Susanne Blakeslee as Madame Web
 Dimitri Diatchenko as Sandman
 Matt Willig as Juggernaut
 Kevin Umbricht as Spider-Ham (uncredited)

Additionally, Spider-Man co-creator Stan Lee narrates the game's story.

Jamie Thomson served as voice director, having previously directed The Spectacular Spider-Man. Jim Dooley composed the game's orchestral score.

Development and marketing

Spider-Man: Shattered Dimensions was unveiled on March 30, 2010, where two of the universes, Amazing and Noir, were revealed. The third universe, 2099, was revealed on June 8. The final universe, Ultimate, was first shown to players at San Diego Comic-Con 2010. Beenox made each universe feel unique by creating an individual art style for each universe and giving each Spider-Man different gameplay mechanics. For example, the Amazing and Ultimate universes are rendered with bright colors and tones of cel shading, with the Amazing universe given a traditional comic feel based on those of 1960s classic comic book art styles, while the Ultimate universe was meant to evoke more modern comics from the early 2000s. In contrast, the Noir and 2099 universes are rendered with realistic graphics, with the 2099 universe given a futuristic feel while the Noir universe was given a "very dark, very gritty" appearance. The developers also worked closely with Marvel Comics to create new versions of characters not seen before in a particular universe, such as Hobgoblin 2099, Hammerhead Noir, and Doctor Octopus 2099. The story for the game was written by Amazing Spider-Man writer Dan Slott and later provided him with an inspiration for the Spider-Verse comic book crossover event, which saw dozens of Spider-Men from alternate realities teaming up.

Several pre-order bonuses were offered for the PlayStation 3 and Xbox 360 versions prior to release. Players who pre-ordered at GameStop received a Cosmic Spider-Man pack, which provided a Cosmic Spider-Man outfit for each Spider-Man. It was later included as a free bonus on the PC version, along with some minor fixes, which were not patched on the console versions. The Cosmic Spider-Man pack was later publicly released as downloadable content for the Xbox 360 on October 28, and for the PlayStation 3 on November 2, 2010.
Pre-orders via Amazon.com included early access to Spider-Man 2099's Iron Spider costume and a book containing concept art for the game. Kmart pre-orders offered early access to Amazing Spider-Man's Scarlet Spider costume, while Best Buy included early access to the Negative Zone costume for Spider-Man Noir. Wal-Mart offered a 20-page comic book for online pre-orders of the game. All the three costumes can otherwise be unlocked with cheat codes on copies of the non-DS versions of the game.

Shattered Dimensions was de-listed from the PlayStation Network and Xbox Live marketplaces in 2014 following the expiration of Activision's existing licensing deal with Marvel. The game was re-released via Steam on October 24, 2015, but was later removed on April 1, 2017.

Reception

The game received mostly positive reviews from critics. Metacritic gave it a score of 73 out of 100 for the DS version; 74 out of 100 for the PlayStation 3 version; 76 out of 100 for the Xbox 360 version; 75 out of 100 for the Wii version; and 68 out of 100 for the PC version.

IGN gave the PlayStation 3 and Xbox 360 versions eight out of ten and said, "Spider-Man: Shattered Dimensions has a lot of great things going for it", but scored the Wii version half a point lower despite being nearly identical to these two versions due to that version lacking a button to center the camera. Game Informer awarded it 8.5 out of 10 and said it "delivers a non-stop action ride with something new around every corner". GamesRadar gave it three-and-a-half stars out of five and said "Shattered Dimensions is a good game, but it fell short of an Ultimate Marvel Team-Up". GamePro gave the Xbox 360 version four and a half out of five stars and said, "thankfully, [Spider-Man's] latest adventure, Shattered Dimensions, is one of his best yet, offering four unique worlds, classic Spidey action, and an engaging story that puts it near the top of the franchise both in terms of quality and impact". X-Play gave the game four stars out of five and said it "streamlines the usual trappings of the genre to focus on combat and personality. It's true that the linear gameplay and old-school combat sensibilities don't put it on par with Arkham Asylum, but the game succeeds regardless. It's fun, fast-paced, and long enough to make it well worth checking out". 1UP.com gave it a B and stated, "the change in combat options is a welcome addition, I just wish that the story had delivered on the comic legacy of one of Marvel's more enduring heroes".

Non-video-game publications gave some strong praise for the game. The A.V. Club gave the Xbox 360 version a B+ and stated: "Filled with countless remember-when moments—as in Remember when you outran that wave of sand?— Shattered Dimensions is less literary and artful than Batman: Arkham Asylum, but it's far more fun". The Daily Telegraph gave it seven out of ten and stated, "the combat, and it's worth noting that this makes up the majority of the game, is superb. It's not particularly deep nor clever, but it's immensely rewarding, as too are the scripted first person sections which exist purely to, yes, let you punch things in the face". However, The Escapist gave the Xbox 360 version three stars out of five and said, "creative set-pieces and an awesome concept can only hide a repetitious game structure for so long - and the stealth sections that mix it up are just frustrating".

The Nintendo DS version of the game drew mixed reviews. IGN and Digital Chumps praised the visuals. IGN felt the visuals stayed true to the comics, while Digital Chumps praised the smooth and detailed animations. Reviewers felt that overall the 2.5D Metroid-style gameplay was enjoyable, and fit the DS well. Sounds and voice acting were also praised. Some reviewers felt the game was too short, and that not enough emphasis was put on exploring the open world.

Legacy
The premise of a crossover between different versions of Spider-Man that was used in Shattered Dimensions later became the inspiration for the 2014 comic book storyline Spider-Verse (the main story of which was also scripted by Dan Slott), which would go on to become one of the most popular and media adapted Spider-Man story-arcs, including a 2018 animated film titled Spider-Man: Into the Spider-Verse.  Despite none of it being adapted from the game, all four playable Spider-Men (Amazing Spider-Man, Spider-Man Noir, Spider-Man 2099, and Ultimate Spider-Man), as well as Spider-Ham, appear, in varying capacities.

References

External links

2010 video games
3D platform games
Action-adventure games
Activision games
Video games about cloning
Cyberpunk video games 
Games for Windows certified games
Metroidvania games
Neo-noir video games 
Nintendo DS games
PlayStation 3 games
Wii games
Xbox 360 games
Windows games
Stealth video games 
Superhero crossover video games
Video games based on Spider-Man
Video games developed in Canada
Video games about parallel universes
Video games scored by James Dooley (composer)
Video games set in 1933 
Video games set in the 2090s 
Video games set in New York City
Video games set in the United States
Video games with cel-shaded animation 
Video games developed in the United States